Marko Kostov Tsepenkov (Bulgarian and ; 1829 – 1920) was a Bulgarian folklorist from Ottoman Macedonia. In his own time, he identified himself, his compatriots and his language as Bulgarian.

After WWII, his native dialect was reclassified as part of the newly codified Macedonian language, and according to the subsequently developed Macedonian historiography, he was an ethnic Macedonian writer and poet. Nevertheless, according to the Macedonian researcher Blaže Ristovski, who was director of the Institute of folklore "Marko Cepenkov" in Skopje, there is no document where Tsepenkov presented himself as an ethnic Macedonian.

Biography 
His family moved to the town of Prilep from the nearby village of Oreovec. His father, Kosta, lived in Kruševo for some time before Marko was born in 1829. Since his father was a traveler, Tsepenkov earned the opportunity to travel. He lived in Ohrid and Struga and visited other places in the country by the time he was fourteen. Tsepenkov was educated in small Greek schools. In 1844 he moved to Prilep, where he attended the private school of Hadji pop Konstantin Dimkov and father Aleksa, for two years. He also became a tailor and while working in the shop he met a lot of people who would tell him folk stories. Tsepenkov was also a good narrator and knew a lot of folk stories. Since then he became a collector of folk stories and other folk works. In 1857 Tsepenkov was a teacher in Prilep. After he met Dimitar Miladinov he started collecting more and more folk works: songs, stories, riddles, and others. In that time he knew more than 150 stories and wrote one to two stories per week, as he mentions in his Autobiography. Marko Tsepenkov contacted with other figures of the Bulgarian National Revival period who noted down folklore, such as Kuzman Shapkarev and  Metodi Kusev. He was influenced by the works of Georgi Rakovski, Vasil Cholakov, Ivan Blaskov and Dimitar Matov.

He moved with his family to Sofia in 1888, where he was to live the rest of his life. Here he was encouraged by Prof. Ivan Shishmanov, who includes his recordings in several volumes of the “Collection of works of the popular spirit” (SBNU). In this collection, published until in 1900, Tsepenkov publishes many tales and legends, songs, a great number of beliefs and curses, interpretations of dreams, magic formulas, habits and rites, proverbs, riddles and folklore for children. Between 1896 and 1911, he published about 10 of his poems and his play "Cane Voivoda," which confirmed his own creative and literary pledge. He also wrote about a dozen songs with patriotic themes, and his "Autobiography". Tsepenkov was in close relations with his countryman, then Metropolitan of Stara Zagora, Metodi Kusev.

Legacy 
The "Institute of Folklore" of the Bulgarian Academy of Sciences works today with the complete edition in six volumes of these folk materials. His collected folk works were published in ten books in Skopje in 1972. A selection of his folktales have been published in English, such as 19th Century Macedonian Folktales by the Macquarie University in Sydney in 1991. In his honor, the Macedonian institute for folklore is named after him.

References

External links
 Tsepenkov's biography and work 
19th Century Macedonian Folktales by Marko Cepenkov
Marko Tsepenkov's Autobiography
Selected folklore materials, collected by Marko Cepenkov and published in "Сборник за народни умотворения, наука и книжнина", Книга VIII, издание на Министерството на народното просвещение, София, 1892 ("A Collection of folklore, science and literature", Book VIII, issue of the Ministry of public education, Sofia, 1892 - in Bulgarian) in the form of text and .jpg photocopies

Bulgarian folklorists
Bulgarian poets
Bulgarian male poets
19th-century Bulgarian writers
1829 births
1920 deaths
People from Prilep
Macedonian Bulgarians